The American Can Company Complex is an historic building complex located at 2127 Northwest 26th Avenue in Portland, Oregon, that was substantially completed in 1921. It was added to the National Register of Historic Places in 1996.

The factory operated for 38 years, with production peaking during World War II.  It could produce 1.5 million packing cans daily at peak production, when it would be employing 600 workers.

See also
 National Register of Historic Places listings in Northwest Portland, Oregon

References

External links
 
 

1921 establishments in Oregon
Buildings and structures completed in 1921
Buildings designated early commercial in the National Register of Historic Places
Industrial buildings and structures on the National Register of Historic Places in Portland, Oregon
Northwest Portland, Oregon
Complex